Football Manager 2005, known as Worldwide Soccer Manager 2005 in North America, is a football management simulation video game for PC Windows and Mac developed by Sports Interactive and published by Sega. It is the inaugural entry in the new Football Manager series, and was succeeded by Football Manager 2006.

Commonly known as FM 2005, it competed directly with Championship Manager 5, the severely delayed and widely slated effort from Eidos-funded Beautiful Game Studios.

It became the fifth fastest-selling PC game of all time at the time according to Chart-Track as well as the fastest selling game from Sega Europe at the time. The Macintosh version of the game came on the same dual format disk as the Windows version, so its sales were also included.

This was the first game from Sports Interactive that was published in North America.

Development
Tensions grew between Sports Interactive and their publisher Eidos Interactive during the troubled development of Championship Manager 4. SI feared that they were about to be replaced, so they prepared for a split. Later it would turn out to be a misunderstanding. SI did redeem themselves with the season update Championship Manager 03/04, where they got things to what they wanted CM4 to be, but the mutual decision to separate had already been announced before the release of CM4.

On 12 February 2004, after splitting from publishers Eidos Interactive, it was announced that Sports Interactive, producers of the Championship Manager games, had acquired the "Football Manager" brand and would henceforth release their games under that name, whilst the Championship Manager series would go on, but no longer be related to Sports Interactive.

Sports Interactive retained the rights to the code and all data from Championship Manager up until the season update 03/04 and based Football Manager 2005 on that.

Gameplay
Football Manager 2005 compared to the previous managing game from Sports Interactive, Championship Manager 03/04, included an updated user interface, a refined game engine, updated database and competition rules, pre- and post-match information, international player news, cup summary news, 2D clips from agents, coach reports on squads, job centre for non-playing positions, mutual contract termination, enhanced player loan options, manager "mind games" and various other features.

Copyright issues
Due to various copyright disputes and restrictions certain alterations had to be made to the game data which took away some of the famous realism known from Sports Interactive and their previous football manager simulation Championship Manager. Noticeable  changes included the following:
 The name of the famous German goalkeeper Oliver Kahn had to be removed from the game and was replaced with the name Jens Mustermann (Mustermann translates from German into English as Sample Man and is the German equivalent of John Doe or Joe Bloggs – see Placeholder name). This is because Kahn does not allow his image or name to be used in certain computer games and it is speculated that his name was changed to Jens in this game (the name of his main goalkeeping rival Jens Lehmann) as a light-hearted dig at Kahn.
 The German national team never picks 'real' players and instead only ever use 'greyed-out' fictional players.
 The names of all French league teams had to be changed from their full names to simply the name of the city they represent. For example, Paris Saint-Germain became Paris and Olympique Marseille became Marseille.
 The names of Japanese league teams were changed to completely fictional names such as Niitsu Unicorn and Katano Blaze.
 The name of the Japanese J.League was changed to the N-League or Nihon League.
 The names of the major European trophies were changed to fictional names. The European Cup or Champions League became the Champions Cup, the UEFA Cup became the Euro Cup and the Intertoto Cup became the Euro Vase.
However, due to the way these data changes have been made (using simple instructions in plain-text files called EDT files and LNC files) almost all of the above changes could be easily reversed – many of them by simply deleting the appropriate file.

Chinese controversy
Football Manager 2005 was banned in China when it was found that places such as Tibet and Taiwan were included as separate countries in imported releases. China banned the game because it felt that it "threatened its content harmful to China's sovereignty and territorial integrity ... [that] seriously violates Chinese law and has been strongly protested by our nation's gamers".
SEGA published a statement in reply, reporting that a Chinese version of the game, complete with Taiwan included as part of China, would be released. They also stated that the offending version was not translated into Chinese as it was not supposed to be released in China. The offending games were believed to have been imported or downloaded, written to CD and boxed to be sold in illegal software shops in China.

Reception

Football Manager 2005 has received favourable reviews from critics. Both GameRankings and Metacritic aggregators rate it at 89 out of 100.

Eurogamer's Kristian Reed called it "a beautiful game of the beautiful game" and gave it a 9 out of 10. GameSpot's Brett Todd deemed it "every bit as thorough and addictive as its predecessors", giving it 8.6 out of 10, and remarked that this is the first time a game from Sports Interactive is being published in North America.

Swedish Gamereactor called it "the real Championship Manager 5, albeit with a different name" and "the absolute pinnacle of the genre" giving it 9 out of 10. The Danish and Norwegian Gamereactor were a little less favourable, giving it a 7 and an 8 respectively. Swedish FZ author "xplejjn" liked the fact that real-world local news like Expressen, Svenskafans.com and Fotbolldirekt.com were in the game and added to the realism.

It received a "Platinum" sales award from the Entertainment and Leisure Software Publishers Association (ELSPA), indicating sales of at least 300,000 copies in the United Kingdom.

It also won the Sunday Times Reader Award for Games at the 2005 Bafta Game awards.

See also
 Championship Manager 5 - Competitor to this game
 Football Manager 2006 - The sequel to this game

References

External links
 FootballManager.net - Official website 
 SIGames.com - Official Sports Interactive website

2004 video games
2005
MacOS games
Video games developed in the United Kingdom
Windows games
Multiplayer and single-player video games
Works banned in China
BAFTA winners (video games)